Qadirabad (also Romanized as Qadīrābād; also known as Ghadīrābād and Qadīnābād) is a village in Radkan Rural District, in the Central District of Chenaran County, Razavi Khorasan Province, Iran. At the 2006 census, its population was 54, in 12 families.

References 

Populated places in Chenaran County